This is a list of women artists who were born in Portugal or whose artworks are closely associated with that country.

A
Sarah Affonso (1899–1983), painter and illustrator
Helena Almeida (1934–2018), photographer, performance artist, painter 
Sofia Areal (born 1960), visual artist
Tereza de Arriaga (1915–2013), painter

B
Maria Augusta Bordalo Pinheiro (1841–1915), painter, lacemaker

C
Lourdes Castro (1930–2022), painter, also collages, shadow puppets, silhouettes 
Evelina Coelho (1945–2013), painter

F
Deolinda Fonseca (born 1954), painter
Marisa Ferreira (born 1983), painter

G
Raquel Gameiro (1889–1970), watercolour painter and illustrator

L
Isabel Laginhas (1942–2018), abstract painter

M
Maluda, Maria de Lourdes Ribeiro (1934–1999), painter and illustrator
Isabel Meyrelles (born 1929), surrealist sculptor, poet

P
Abigail de Paiva Cruz (1883–1944), painter, sculptor
Regina Pessoa (born 1969), animator

R
Rosa Ramalho (1888–1977), ceramist
Paula Rego (1935–2022), visual artist

S
Aurélia de Souza (1866–1922), Chilean-born Portuguese painter
Sofia Martins de Sousa (1870–1960), Portuguese painter
Teresa Nunes Alves de Sousa (born 1979), visual artist
Katherine Swift (1956–2004), Irish-born Portuguese painter

T
Ana Tristany (born 1966), painter, educator

V
Joana Vasconcelos (born 1971), contemporary artist
Maria Helena Vieira da Silva (1908–1992), Portuguese-French abstractionist painter

-
Portuguese
Artists, women
Artists